Friends is a 1912 film written and directed by D. W. Griffith and starring Mary Pickford, Henry B. Walthall, Lionel Barrymore, and Harry Carey. Walthall and Barrymore portray two old friends who each wind up involved with a beautiful girl (Pickford) who lives above a mining camp saloon.

The film, by the Biograph Company, was shot in Fort Lee, New Jersey when many early film studios in America's first motion picture industry were based there at the beginning of the 20th century. A print of Friends was run at the Museum of Modern Art in New York City in July 2007 as part of a Biograph retrospective.

Cast
 Mary Pickford as Dora (the orphan)
 Henry B. Walthall as Dandy Jack
 Lionel Barrymore as Grizzley Fallon (Dandy Jack's friend)
 Harry Carey as Bob Kyne (the prospector)
 Charles Hill Mailes as The bartender
 Elmer Booth as Man in saloon
 Frank Evans as Man in saloon
 Robert Harron as Stableboy
 Adolph Lestina as Man in saloon
 Walter Miller as Man in saloon
 W. C. Robinson as Man in saloon

See also
 Harry Carey filmography
 D. W. Griffith filmography
 Lionel Barrymore filmography
 Mary Pickford filmography

References

External links

 Friends on YouTube

1912 films
American silent short films
American black-and-white films
Films directed by D. W. Griffith
Films shot in Fort Lee, New Jersey
1910s romance films
American romance films
1910s American films